Goosebumps is a series of children's horror fiction novellas by R. L. Stine. 62 books were published under the Goosebumps umbrella title from 1992 to 1997; the first was Welcome to Dead House; the last was Monster Blood IV. Some of the books were reprinted in 2003-2004 with slightly altered covers. A reprint series unofficially referred to as "Classic Goosebumps" reprinted 22 Goosebumps books from 2008 to 2011 with new artwork and bonus features such as interviews with the author; ten more books were given a similar treatment in 2015 and four more in 2018 for a total of 36 books in the "Classic" reprint series. Of these, 32 are from the original series, three (Attack of the Graveyard Ghouls, The Haunted Car, and Bride of the Living Dummy) are from Goosebumps 2000, and one (Please Don't Feed the Vampire) is from Give Yourself Goosebumps. 10 books were also made into comic books under the title Goosebumps Graphix. These were released in 4 groups: Creepy Creatures, Terror Trips and Scary Summer. The last book was 4 Goosebumps books in one called Slappy's Tales of Horror.

There were also two hardcover reprint collections: Goosebumps Collection and Monster Edition. Nine books were released under the Goosebumps Collection title and were split into three groups: Living Dummy Collection, Campfire Collection, and Monster Blood Collection. Another 12 books were released under the Monster Edition title and were split into four groups, the first three of which were simply numbered while the fourth was called Fright Light Edition. 57 of the books were reprinted with original artwork, all except for #24, #47, #60, #61, and #62. All books, except #5, #7, #17, #18, #19, #29, #33, #38, #42, #43, #45, #47, #51, #52, #53, #56, #59, #61, and #62, were also adapted for television.

Retro collector's tins containing 5 books each have been released every few years since 2015. These reprints feature the original cover art, but lack the embossed titles of the original printings. They also lack the numbers on the spines indicating each book's position within the series. The "Retro Scream Collection" (October 27, 2015) includes Welcome to Dead House, Say Cheese And Die!, Night of the Living Dummy, The Haunted Mask, and One Day at HorrorLand. The "25th Anniversary Retro Set" (September 26, 2017) includes Monster Blood, Why I'm Afraid of Bees, A Night in Terror Tower, The Beast From the East, and Legend of the Lost Legend. The "Retro Fear Set" (September 1, 2020) includes Stay Out of the Basement, Piano Lessons Can Be Murder, Werewolf of Fever Swamp, Cuckoo Clock of Doom, and The Haunted School.

List of books

External links
  at Scholastic Press

Book series introduced in 1992
Goosebumps
1990s children's books